The 1802–03 United States House of Representatives elections were held on various dates in various states between April 26, 1802 (in New York) and December 14, 1803 (in New Jersey). Each state set its own date for its elections to the House of Representatives, either before or after the first session of the 8th United States Congress convened on October 17, 1803. They occurred during President Thomas Jefferson's first term in office.

With the addition of the new state of Ohio's representatives, and the congressional reapportionment based on the 1800 United States Census, the size of the House increased from 106 to 142 seats. The greatest population growth revealed in the 1800 Census was in territories that constituted the western regions of the country at the time, a tremendous boost for Democratic-Republican candidates. Nearly all of the new seats created in the reapportionment went to Democratic-Republicans, closely aligned as they were with the agrarian interests of Western farmers. As a result, the Democratic-Republicans won the largest proportion of seats that either they or the competing Federalists had ever been able to secure in any earlier Congress, a supermajority greater than two-thirds of the total number.

Election summaries
These elections were the first following reapportionment after the 1800 Census. Thirty-five new seats were added in reapportionment, with three states having no change in apportionment, and thirteen states gaining between 1 and 7 seats. One further seat was added for the new state of Ohio, which is included in this table below.

Special elections 

There were special elections in 1802 and 1803 during the 7th United States Congress and 8th United States Congress.

Elections are sorted here by date then district.

7th Congress 

|-
! 
| Richard Sprigg, Jr.
|  | Democratic-Republican
| 1801
|  | Incumbent resigned February 11, 1802.New member elected March 2, 1802.Democratic-Republican hold.New member seated March 24, 1802.New member was later elected to the next term, see below.
| nowrap | 

|-
! 
| Thomas Sumter
|  | Democratic-Republican
| 17881792 1796
|  | Incumbent resigned December 15, 1801, when elected U.S. senator.New member elected April 13, 1802.Democratic-Republican hold.New member seated January 24, 1803.
| nowrap | 

|-
! 
| Benjamin Taliaferro
|  | Democratic-Republican
| 1798
|  | Incumbent resigned sometime in 1802.New member elected April 26, 1802.Democratic-Republican hold.New member seated December 6, 1802.
| nowrap | 

|-
! 
| Silas Lee
|  | Federalist
| 1798
|  | Incumbent resigned August 20, 1801.New member elected July 29, 1802 on the fifth ballot.Federalist hold.New member seated December 6, 1802.
| nowrap | First ballot :Orchard Cook (Democratic-Republican) 47.9%Martin Kingsley (Democratic-Republican) 23.6%Nathaniel Drummer (Unknown) 24.1%Scattering 4.3%Second ballot :Orchard Cook (Democratic-Republican) 42.5%Martin Kingsley (Democratic-Republican) 34.2%Phineas Bruce (Federalist) 7.1%Nathaniel Drummer (Unknown) 16.2%Third ballot :Orchard Cook (Democratic-Republican) 45.0%Martin Kingsley (Democratic-Republican) 32.4%Phineas Bruce (Federalist) 13.3%Nathaniel Drummer (Unknown) 9.2%Fourth ballot :Samuel Thatcher (Federalist) 33.0%Martin Kingsley (Democratic-Republican) 45.0%Phineas Bruce (Federalist) 8.3%Scattering 13.6%Fifth ballot :

|-
! 
| Joseph Peirce
|  | Federalist
| 1800
|  | Incumbent resigned sometime in 1802.New member elected August 30, 1802.Federalist hold.New member seated December 6, 1802.New member also elected, the same day, to the next term, see below.
| nowrap | 

|-
! 
| Narsworthy Hunter
|  | Democratic-Republican
| 1801
|  | Incumbent died March 11, 1802.New delegate elected August 1, 1802.Democratic-Republican hold.New delegate seated December 6, 1802.Winner was not elected to the next term, see below.
| nowrap | 

|-
! 
| Charles Johnson
|  | Democratic-Republican
| 1800
|  | Incumbent died July 23, 1802.New member elected October 15, 1802.Democratic-Republican hold.New member seated December 7, 1802.
| nowrap | 

|-
! 
| John Milledge
|  | Democratic-Republican
| 1794
|  | Incumbent resigned May 1802 to become Governor of Georgia.New member elected December 15, 1802.Democratic-Republican hold.New member seated January 10, 1803.
| nowrap | 

|}

8th Congress 

|-
! 
| John Cantine
|  | Democratic-Republican
| 1802
|  | Incumbent resigned before the Congress began.New member elected April 28, 1803.Democratic-Republican hold.Winner was seated October 17, 1803.
| nowrap | 

|-
! 
| Elias Perkins
|  | Federalist
| 1800
|  | Incumbent chose not to serve.New member elected September 5, 1803.Federalist hold.Winner was seated October 17, 1803.
| nowrap | 

|-
! 
| Isaac Bloom
|  | Democratic-Republican
| 1802
|  | Incumbent died April 26, 1803.New member elected September 16, 1803.Democratic-Republican hold.Winner was seated October 17, 1803.
| nowrap | 

|-
! 
| John Milledge
|  | Democratic-Republican
| 1794
|  | Incumbent chose not to serve, having been elected Governor of Georgia.New member elected October 3, 1803.Democratic-Republican hold.New member seated October 17, 1803.
| nowrap | 

|}

Connecticut 

|-
! rowspan=7 | 
| John Cotton Smith
|  | Federalist
| 1800
| Incumbent re-elected.
| rowspan=7 nowrap | 

|-
| Benjamin Tallmadge
|  | Federalist
| 1801
| Incumbent re-elected.

|-
| Samuel W. Dana
|  | Federalist
| 1796
| Incumbent re-elected.

|-
| Elias Perkins
|  | Federalist
| 1800
| Incumbent re-elected but declined to serve, leading to a special election.

|-
| Calvin Goddard
|  | Federalist
| 1801
| Incumbent re-elected.

|-
| Roger Griswold
|  | Federalist
| 1794
| Incumbent re-elected.

|-
| John Davenport
|  | Federalist
| 1798
| Incumbent re-elected.

|}

Delaware 

|-
! 
| James A. Bayard
|  | Federalist
| 1796
|  | Incumbent lost re-election.New member elected.Democratic-Republican gain.
| nowrap | 

|}

Georgia 

Georgia gained 2 seats in reapportionment after the 1800 census.  It elected its representatives October 4, 1802, at-large on a general ticket.

|-
! rowspan=4 | 
| John Milledge
|  | Democratic-Republican
| 1801 
| Incumbent resigned in May 1802, leading to a December 15, 1802, special election.Incumbent elected to the next term, but declined the seat, leading to an October 3, 1803, special election.
| rowspan=4 nowrap | 

|-
| David Meriwether
|  | Democratic-Republican
| 1802 
| Incumbent re-elected.

|-
| colspan=3 | None (Seat created)
|  | New seat.New member elected.Democratic-Republican gain.

|-
| colspan=3 | None (Seat created)
|  | New seat.New member elected.Democratic-Republican gain.

|}

Kentucky 

Kentucky gained 4 seats to 6 in reapportionment after the 1800 census.

|-
! 
| Thomas T. Davis
|  | Democratic-Republican
| 1797
|  | Incumbent retired.New member elected.Democratic-Republican hold.
| nowrap | 

|-
! 
| colspan=3 | None (District created)
|  | New seat.New member elected.Democratic-Republican gain.
| nowrap | 

|-
! 
| colspan=3 | None (District created)
|  | New seat.New member elected.Democratic-Republican gain.
| nowrap | 

|-
! 
| colspan=3 | None (District created)
|  | New seat.New member elected.Democratic-Republican gain.
| nowrap | 

|-
! 
| John Fowler
|  | Democratic-Republican
| 1797
| Incumbent re-elected.
| nowrap | 

|-
! 
| colspan=3 | None (District created)
|  | New seat.New member elected.Democratic-Republican gain.
| nowrap | 

|}

Maryland 

Maryland gained 1 seat in reapportionment after the 1800 census. Rather than increasing the number of districts, however, Maryland made the  a plural district with 2 seats.

|-
! 
| John Campbell
|  | Federalist
| 1801
| Incumbent re-elected.
| nowrap | 

|-
! 
| Walter Bowie
|  | Democratic-Republican
| 1802 
| Incumbent re-elected.
| nowrap | 

|-
! 
| Thomas Plater
|  | Federalist
| 1801
| Incumbent re-elected.
| nowrap | 

|-
! 
| Daniel Hiester
|  | Democratic-Republican
| 1788 (Pennsylvania)1801
| Incumbent re-elected.
| nowrap | 

|-
! rowspan=2 | 
| Samuel Smith
|  | Democratic-Republican
| 1792
|  | Incumbent retired to run for Senate.New member elected.Democratic-Republican hold.
| rowspan=2 nowrap | 

|-
| colspan=3 | None (Seat created)
|  | New seat.New member elected.Democratic-Republican gain.

|-
! 
| John Archer
|  | Democratic-Republican
| 1801
| Incumbent re-elected.
| nowrap | 

|-
! 
| Joseph H. Nicholson
|  | Democratic-Republican
| 1798 
| Incumbent re-elected.
| nowrap | 

|-
! 
| John Dennis
|  | Federalist
| 1796
| Incumbent re-elected.
| nowrap | 

|}

Massachusetts 

Massachusetts increased 3 seats to 17 in reapportionment after the 1800 census.

|-
! 
| William Eustis
|  | Democratic-Republican
| 1800
| Incumbent re-elected.
| nowrap | 

|-
! 
| Nathan Read
|  | Federalist
| 1800 
|  | Incumbent retired.New member elected.Democratic-Republican gain.
| nowrap | 

|-
! 
| Manasseh Cutler
|  | Federalist
| 1800
| Incumbent re-elected.
| nowrap | 

|-
! 
| Joseph Bradley Varnum
|  | Democratic-Republican
| 1795
| Incumbent re-elected.
| nowrap | 

|-
! 
| William Shepard
|  | Federalist
| 1797
|  | Incumbent retired.New member elected.Federalist hold.
| nowrap | 

|-
! 
| Ebenezer Mattoon
|  | Federalist
| 1800 
|  | Incumbent retired.New member elected.Federalist hold.
| nowrap | First ballot :Hugh McClallan (Federalist) 29.5%John Williams (Federalist) 15.2%Samuel Taggart (Federalist) 14.9%Solomon Snead (Democratic-Republican) 12.3%Joseph Lyman (Federalist) 10.1%Solomon Nose (Federalist) 8.0%Edward Upham (Democratic-Republican) 5.2%Zebina Montague 4.8%Second ballot :Hugh McClallan (Federalist) 36.9%Samuel Taggart (Federalist) 27.5%Solomon Snead (Democratic-Republican) 21.2%John Williams (Federalist) 14.4%Third ballot :

|-
! 
| Josiah Smith
|  | Democratic-Republican
| 1801
|  | Incumbent retired.New member elected.Federalist gain.
| nowrap | 

|-
! 
| Lemuel Williams
|  | Federalist
| 1799
| Incumbent re-elected.
| nowrap | 

|-
! 
| Phanuel Bishop
|  | Democratic-Republican
| 1799
| Incumbent re-elected.
| nowrap | 

|-
! 
| Seth Hastings
|  | Federalist
| 1801 
| Incumbent re-elected.
| nowrap | 

|-
! 
| colspan=3 | None (District created)
|  | New seat.New member elected.Federalist gain.
| nowrap | 

|-
! 
| John Bacon
|  | Democratic-Republican
| 1801
|  | Incumbent retired.New member elected.Democratic-Republican hold.
| nowrap | 

|-
! 
| colspan=3 | None (District created)
|  | New seat.New member elected.Democratic-Republican gain.
| nowrap | 

|-
! 
| Richard Cutts
|  | Democratic-Republican
| 1801 
| Incumbent re-elected.
| nowrap | 

|-
! 
| Peleg Wadsworth
|  | Federalist
| 1793
| Incumbent re-elected.
| nowrap | 

|-
! 
| Samuel Thatcher
|  | Federalist
| 1802 
| Incumbent re-elected.
| nowrap | 

|-
! 
| colspan=3 | None (District created)
|  | New seat.New member elected.Federalist gain.
| nowrap | 

|}

Mississippi Territory 
See Non-voting delegates, below.

New Hampshire 

New Hampshire increased its apportionment from 4 seats to 5 after the 1800 census.

|-
! rowspan=5 | 
| Samuel Tenney
|  | Federalist
| 1800
| Incumbent re-elected.
| rowspan=5 nowrap | 

|-
| colspan=3 | Vacant.
|  | Incumbent Joseph Peirce resigned in 1802.New member elected.Federalist hold.

|-
| George B. Upham
|  | Federalist
| 1800
|  | Incumbent retired.New member elected.Federalist hold.

|-
| Abiel Foster
|  | Federalist
| 1794
|  | Incumbent retired.New member elected.Federalist hold.

|-
| colspan=3 | None (Seat created)
|  | New seat.New member elected.Federalist gain.

|}

New Jersey 

New Jersey increased its apportionment from 5 seats to 6 after the 1800 census.

The Federalists did not run any official candidates in 1802, but a few Federalists did receive scattered votes.

|-
! rowspan=6 | 
| John Condit
|  | Democratic-Republican
| 1798
|  | Incumbent retired to run for Senate.New member elected.Democratic-Republican hold.
| rowspan=6 nowrap | 

|-
| Ebenezer Elmer
|  | Democratic-Republican
| 1800
| Incumbent re-elected.

|-
| William Helms
|  | Democratic-Republican
| 1800
| Incumbent re-elected.

|-
| James Mott
|  | Democratic-Republican
| 1800
| Incumbent re-elected.

|-
| Henry Southard
|  | Democratic-Republican
| 1800
| Incumbent re-elected.

|-
| colspan=3 | None (Seat created)
|  | New seat.New member elected.Democratic-Republican gain.

|}

New York 

New York's apportionment increased from 10 seats to 17 seats after the 1800 census. The state was subsequently redistricted. 11 open seats were available due to the increase in apportionment and retirement of incumbents.

|-
! 
| John Smith
|  | Democratic-Republican
| 1799 
| Incumbent re-elected.
| nowrap | 

|-
! 
| colspan=3 | None (District created)
|  | New seat.New member elected.Federalist gain.
| nowrap | 

|-
! 
| Samuel L. Mitchill
|  | Democratic-Republican
| 1800
| Incumbent re-elected.
| nowrap | 

|-
! 
| Philip Van Courtlandt
|  | Democratic-Republican
| 1793
| Incumbent re-elected.
| nowrap | 

|-
! 
| colspan=3 | None (District created)
|  | New seat.New member elected.Democratic-Republican gain.
| nowrap | 

|-
! 
| Theodorus Bailey
|  | Democratic-Republican
| 17931796 17981800 1801 
|  | Incumbent retired to run for U.S. senator.New member elected.Democratic-Republican gain.
| nowrap | 

|-
! 
| Lucas Elmendorf
|  | Democratic-Republican
| 1796
|  | Incumbent retired.New member elected.Democratic-Republican gain.
| nowrap | 

|-
! 
| John P. Van Ness
|  | Democratic-Republican
| 1801 
|  | Incumbent lost re-election.New member elected.Federalist gain.
| nowrap | 

|-
! 
| Killian Van Rensselaer
|  | Federalist
| 1800
| Incumbent re-elected.
| nowrap | 

|-
! 
| colspan=3 | None (District created)
|  | New seat.New member elected.Federalist gain.
| nowrap | 

|-
! 
| colspan=3 | None (District created)
|  | New seat.New member elected.Democratic-Republican gain.
| nowrap | 

|-
! 
| David Thomas
|  | Democratic-Republican
| 1800
| Incumbent re-elected.
| nowrap | 

|-
! 
| colspan=3 | None (District created)
|  | New seat.New member elected.Democratic-Republican gain.
| nowrap | 

|-
! 
| colspan=3 | None (District created)
|  | New seat.New member elected.Democratic-Republican gain.
| nowrap | 

|-
! 
| colspan=3 | None (District created)
|  | New seat.New member elected.Federalist gain.
| nowrap | 

|-
! 
| Benjamin Walker
|  | Federalist
| 1800
|  | Incumbent retired.New member elected.Democratic-Republican gain.
| nowrap | 

|-
! 
| Thomas Morris
|  | Federalist
| 1800
|  | Incumbent retired.New member elected.Democratic-Republican gain.
| nowrap | 

|}

North Carolina 

North Carolina increased its apportionment from 10 to 12 seats after the 1800 census.

|-
! 
| Thomas Wynns
|  | Democratic-Republican
| 1802 
| Incumbent re-elected.
| nowrap | 

|-
! 
| Willis Alston
|  | Democratic-Republican
| 1798
| Incumbent re-elected.
| nowrap | 

|-
! 
| colspan=3 | None (District created)
|  | New seat.New member elected.Democratic-Republican gain.
| nowrap | 

|-
! 
| John Stanly
|  | Federalist
| 1800
|  | Incumbent lost re-election.New member elected.Democratic-Republican gain.
| nowrap | 

|-
! 
| William H. Hill
|  | Federalist
| 1798
|  | Incumbent retired when appointed U.S. District Judge (later withdrawn).New member elected.Democratic-Republican gain.
| nowrap | 

|-
! 
| Nathaniel Macon
|  | Democratic-Republican
| 1791
| Incumbent re-elected.
| nowrap | 

|-
! rowspan=2 | 
| William B. Grove
|  | Federalist
| 1790
|  | Incumbent retired.New member elected.Federalist hold.
| rowspan=2 nowrap | 
|-
| Robert Williams
|  | Democratic-Republican
| 1796
|  | Incumbent retired to run for Governor of North Carolina.Democratic-Republican loss.

|-
! 
| Richard Stanford
|  | Democratic-Republican
| 1796
| Incumbent re-elected.
| nowrap | 

|-
! 
| colspan=3 | None (District created)
|  | New seat.New member elected.Democratic-Republican gain.
| nowrap | 

|-
! 
| colspan=3 | None (District created)
|  | New seat.New member elected.Democratic-Republican gain.
| nowrap | 

|-
! 
| James Holland
|  | Democratic-Republican
| 1800
| Incumbent re-elected.
| nowrap | 

|-
! 
| Archibald Henderson
|  | Federalist
| 1798
|  | Incumbent retired.New member elected.Democratic-Republican gain.
| nowrap | 

|}

Ohio 

|-
! 
| colspan=3 | Ohio is considered to have been admitted to the Union near the end of the 7th Congress, but did not elect representatives until the 8th Congress. For this reason, Ohio is considered to have had a vacant seat in the House and two vacant seats in the Senate in the 7th Congress.
|  | New seat.New member elected.Democratic-Republican gain
| nowrap | 

|}

Pennsylvania 

Pennsylvania increased its apportionment from 13 to 18 seats after the 1800 census. The state was re-districted from 12 into 11 districts, four of which were plural districts.

|-
! rowspan=3 | 
| William Jones
|  | Democratic-Republican
| 1800
|  | Incumbent retired.New member elected.Democratic-Republican hold.
| rowspan=3 nowrap | 

|-
| colspan=3 | None (Seat created)
|  | New seat.New member elected.Democratic-Republican gain.

|-
| Michael Leib
|  | Democratic-Republican
| 1798
| Incumbent re-elected.

|-
! rowspan=3 | 
| Robert Brown
|  | Democratic-Republican
| 1798 
| Incumbent re-elected.
| rowspan=3 nowrap | 

|-
| colspan=3 | None (Seat created)
|  | New seat.New member elected.Democratic-Republican gain.

|-
| Isaac Van Horne
|  | Democratic-Republican
| 1801 
| Incumbent re-elected.

|-
! rowspan=3 | 
| Joseph Hemphill
|  | Federalist
| 1800
|  | Incumbent lost re-election.New member elected.Democratic-Republican gain.
| rowspan=3 nowrap | 

|-
| Joseph Hiester
|  | Democratic-Republican
| 1797 
| Incumbent re-elected.

|-
| Thomas Boude
|  | Federalist
| 1800
|  | Incumbent lost re-election.New member elected.Democratic-Republican gain.

|-
! rowspan=2 | 
| John A. Hanna
|  | Democratic-Republican
| 1796
| Incumbent re-elected.
| rowspan=2 nowrap | 

|-
| colspan=3 | None (Seat created)
|  | New seat.New member elected.Democratic-Republican gain.

|-
! 
| Andrew Gregg
|  | Democratic-Republican
| 1791
| Incumbent re-elected.
| nowrap | 

|-
! 
| John Stewart
|  | Democratic-Republican
| 1800
| Incumbent re-elected.
| nowrap | 

|-
! 
| Henry Woods
|  | Federalist
| 1798
|  | Incumbent lost re-election.New member elected.Democratic-Republican gain.
| nowrap | 

|-
! 
| colspan=3 | None (District created)
|  | New seat.New member elected.Democratic-Republican gain.
| nowrap | 

|-
! 
| John Smilie
|  | Democratic-Republican
| 17921798
| Incumbent re-elected.
| nowrap | 

|-
! 
| William Hoge
|  | Democratic-Republican
| 1801 
| Incumbent re-elected.
| nowrap | 

|-
! 
| colspan=3 | None (District created)
|  | New seat.New member elected.Democratic-Republican gain.
| nowrap | 

|}

Rhode Island 

|-
! rowspan=2 | 
| Thomas Tillinghast
|  | Democratic-Republican
| 1800
|  | Incumbent lost re-election.New member elected.Democratic-Republican hold.
| rowspan=2 nowrap | 

|-
| Joseph Stanton Jr.
|  | Democratic-Republican
| 1800
| Incumbent re-elected.

|}

South Carolina 

South Carolina increased its apportionment from 6 seats to 8 after the 1800 census.

|-
! 
| Thomas Lowndes
|  | Federalist
| 1800
| Incumbent re-elected.
| nowrap | 

|-
! rowspan=2 | 
| John Rutledge Jr.
|  | Federalist
| 1796
|  | Incumbent lost re-election.New member elected.Democratic-Republican gain.
| rowspan=2 nowrap | 

|-
| William Butler Sr.
|  | Democratic-Republican
| 1800
| Incumbent re-elected.

|-
! 
| Benjamin Huger
|  | Federalist
| 1798
| Incumbent re-elected.
| nowrap | 

|-
! 
| colspan=3 | None (District created)
|  | New seat.New member elected.Democratic-Republican gain.
| nowrap | 

|-
! 
| Richard Winn
|  | Democratic-Republican
| 1802 
| Incumbent re-elected.
| nowrap | 

|-
! 
| colspan=3 | None (District created)
|  | New seat.New member elected.Democratic-Republican gain.
| nowrap | 

|-
! 
| Thomas Moore
|  | Democratic-Republican
| 1800
| Incumbent re-elected.
| nowrap | 

|-
! 
| colspan=3 | None (District created)
|  | New seat.New member elected.Democratic-Republican gain.
| nowrap | 

|}

Tennessee 

Tennessee increased its apportionment from 1 seat to 3 seats after the 1800 census.

|-
! rowspan=3 | 
| William Dickson
|  | Democratic-Republican
| 1801
| Incumbent re-elected.
| rowspan=3 nowrap | 

|-
| colspan=3 | None (Seat created)
|  | New seat.New member elected.Democratic-Republican gain.

|-
| colspan=3 | None (Seat created)
|  | New seat.New member elected.Democratic-Republican gain.

|}

Vermont 

Vermont increased its apportionment from 2 seats to 4 after the 1800 census. Vermont law at the time required a majority of votes to win an office, which frequently necessitated additional ballots.

|-
! 
| Israel Smith
|  | Democratic-Republican
| 17911797 1800
|  | Incumbent retired to run for U.S. senator.New member elected.Democratic-Republican hold.
| nowrap | 

|-
! 
| Lewis R. Morris
|  | Federalist
| 1797 
|  | Incumbent lost re-election.New member elected.Federalist hold.
| nowrap | First ballot :Lewis R. Morris (Federalist) 45.6%James Elliot (Federalist) 42.7%Paul Brigham (Democratic-Republican) 5.4%Amasa Paine (Federalist) 2.9%Others 3.4%Second ballot :

|-
! 
| colspan=3 | None (District created)
|  | New seat.New member elected.Federalist gain.
| nowrap | 

|-
! 
| colspan=3 | None (District created)
|  | New seat.New member elected.Federalist gain.
| nowrap | First ballot :Udney Hay (Democratic-Republican) 45.3%Martin Chittenden (Federalist) 28.2%Amos Marsh (Federalist) 19.6%Daniel Chipman (Federalist) 2.3%William C. Harrington (Federalist) 1.9%Others 2.7%Second ballot :Udney Hay (Democratic-Republican) 49.2%Martin Chittenden (Federalist) 29.8%Amos Marsh (Federalist)  19.9%Others 1.1%Third ballot :

|}

Virginia 

Virginia increased its apportionment from 19 to 22 seats after the 1800 census. Virginia's congressional delegation remained the largest of any state, but would lose this distinction permanently after the Census of 1810. Elections were held over three days in April 1803.

|-
! 
| George Jackson
|  | Democratic-Republican
| 17951797 1799
|  | Incumbent retired.New member (incumbent's son) elected.Democratic-Republican hold.
| nowrap | 

|-
! 
| colspan=3 | None (District created)
|  | New seat.New member elected.Federalist gain.
| nowrap | 

|-
! 
| John Smith
|  | Democratic-Republican
| 1801
| Incumbent re-elected.
| nowrap | 

|-
! 
| David Holmes
|  | Democratic-Republican
| 1797
| Incumbent re-elected.
| nowrap | 

|-
! 
| colspan=3 | None (District created)
|  | New seat.New member elected.Federalist gain.Results were subsequently challenged and overturned.
| nowrap | 

|-
! 
| Abram Trigg
|  | Democratic-Republican
| 1797
| Incumbent re-elected.
| nowrap | 

|-
! 
| Richard Brent
|  | Democratic-Republican
| 1801
|  | Incumbent lost re-election.New member elected.Federalist gain.
| nowrap | 

|-
! 
| colspan=3 | None (District created)
|  | New seat.New member elected.Democratic-Republican gain.
| nowrap | 

|-
! 
| Philip R. Thompson
|  | Democratic-Republican
| 1793
| Incumbent re-elected.
| nowrap | 

|-
! 
| John Dawson
|  | Democratic-Republican
| 1797
| Incumbent re-elected.
| nowrap | 

|-
! 
| Anthony New
|  | Democratic-Republican
| 1793
| Incumbent re-elected.
| nowrap | 

|-
! 
| colspan=3 | None (District created)
|  | New seat.New member elected.Federalist gain.
| nowrap | 

|-
! 
| John J. Trigg
|  | Democratic-Republican
| 1797
| Incumbent re-elected.
| nowrap | 

|-
! 
| Matthew Clay
|  | Democratic-Republican
| 1797
| Incumbent re-elected.
| nowrap | 

|-
! 
| John Randolph
|  | Democratic-Republican
| 1799
| Incumbent re-elected.
| nowrap | 

|-
! 
| William B. Giles
|  | Democratic-Republican
| 1790 1798 1801
|  | Incumbent retired.New member elected.Democratic-Republican hold.
| nowrap | 

|-
! 
| Thomas Claiborne
|  | Democratic-Republican
| 17931801
| Incumbent re-elected.
| nowrap | 

|-
! 
| colspan=3 | None (District created)
|  | New seat.New member elected.Democratic-Republican gain.
| nowrap | 

|-
! rowspan=2 | 
| Edwin Gray
|  | Democratic-Republican
| 1799
| Incumbent re-elected.
| rowspan=2 nowrap | 
|-
| John Taliaferro
|  | Democratic-Republican
| 1801
|  | Incumbent retired.Democratic-Republican loss.

|-
! 
| Thomas Newton Jr.
|  | Democratic-Republican
| 1799
| Incumbent re-elected.
| nowrap | 

|-
! 
| Samuel J. Cabell
|  | Democratic-Republican
| 1795
|  | Incumbent lost re-election.New member elected.Democratic-Republican hold.
| nowrap | 

|-
! 
| John Clopton
|  | Democratic-Republican
| 1801
| Incumbent re-elected.
| nowrap | 

|}

Non-voting delegates 

|-
! 
| Thomas M. Green Jr.
|  | Democratic-Republican
| 1802 
|  | Incumbent retired.New delegate elected on an unknown date.Democratic-Republican hold.
| nowrap | 

|}

See also
 1802 United States elections
 List of United States House of Representatives elections (1789–1822)
 1802–03 United States Senate elections
 7th United States Congress
 8th United States Congress

Notes

References

Bibliography

External links
 Office of the Historian (Office of Art & Archives, Office of the Clerk, U.S. House of Representatives)